Zelimovo (Yılım) is a rural locality (a village) in Ishberdinsky Selsoviet, Baymaksky District, Bashkortostan, Russia. The population was 254 as of 2010. There are 5 streets.

Geography 
Zelimovo is located 62 km west of Baymak (the district's administrative centre) by road. Yuluk is the nearest rural locality.

References 

Rural localities in Baymaksky District